Denise Dillon (born September 22, 1973) is the head women's basketball coach at Villanova.

Career
She returned to her alma mater from Drexel, where she was the program's most successful coach since it moved to Division I in 1982–83. She had been at the helm of the Dragons program since 2003, and was named the 2005, 2009, 2018, and 2020 CAA Coach of the Year.

Dillon guided the Dragons to the 2009 CAA Championship and a berth in that year's NCAA tournament. The star of that team was Gabriela Mărginean, a junior at the time who would go on to become the all-time scoring leader in the history of Philadelphia area collegiate women's basketball. Following that championship season, Dillon steered the Dragons to four-consecutive WNIT appearances, the program's first-ever postseason victory in the 2012 WNIT over Fairfield, and the 2013 WNIT championship.

From 1993 to 1996, she was a star basketball player at Villanova University. She earned three All Big-East honors at Villanova. She became just the 12th player in school history to score 1,000 points. She later served as an assistant on the Wildcats basketball team from 1997 to 2001. For her playing career, Dillon was enshrined in the Philadelphia Big 5 Hall of Fame, the Villanova Wildcats Hall of Fame, and her native Delaware County, Pennsylvania Athletics Hall of Fame.

On March 27, 2020, it was announced that Dillon would become the head coach of Villanova's Women's Basketball team; taking the helm from coach Harry Perretta after his 42nd season with the team.

In 2022, Dillon was named the Big East Coach of the Year. The team was picked to finish 5th in the preseason polls, but the team ended up in second place behind the University of Connecticut. Dillon's Villanova Wildcats earned an invitation to the NCAA women's basketball tournament, and upset sixth-seeded BYU in the opening-round behind 25 points from Maddy Siegrist.

Head Coaching Record

References

External links
 Official bio

1973 births
Living people
American women's basketball coaches
Drexel Dragons women's basketball coaches
Villanova Wildcats women's basketball coaches
Villanova Wildcats women's basketball players